was a renowned Japanese photographer.

References

Japanese photographers
1903 births
1974 deaths